Émile Bergerat (29 April 1845 – 13 October 1923) was a French poet, playwright and essayist. He used the pseudonyms l'Homme masqué (the masked man), Caliban and Ariel (the latter two drawn from The Tempest by William Shakespeare). A library in Neuilly-sur-Seine opposite his flat bears his name.

Life
Bergerat was born in Paris. An essayist for Voltaire and Figaro, head of the La Vie moderne review under the editorship of Georges Charpentier and a member of the Académie Goncourt, he was the son in law of Théophile Gautier and the brother in law of Théophile Gautier (fils). Émile Bergerat married Estelle Gautier, daughter of Théophile Gautier, and they had one son, Théo Bergerat, director and radio essayist. Théophile wrote in a letter to Carlotta Grisi that Émile was

Bergerat died in Neuilly-sur-Seine, aged 78.

Works 
Les cuirassiers de Reichshoffen (Lemerre, 1871)
A. Chateaudun (Lemerre, 1871)
Poèmes de la guerre 1870-1871 (1871)
Les Provinciales (1871)
Peintures décoratives de Paul Baudry au grand foyer de l'Opéra, critical study, preface by Théophile Gautier (1875)
Théophile Gautier, peintre : étude, suivie du Catalogue de son œuvre peint, dessiné et gravé (1877)
Théophile Gautier. Entretiens, souvenirs et correspondance (Charpentier, 1879)
Enguerrande, dramatic poem (1884)
Bébé et Cie (1884)
Le Viol (Ollendorff, 1885)
Vie et aventures du sieur Caliban. 1884-85 (1886)
Le Livre de Caliban (Lemerre, 1887)
Le Petit Moreau, novel (1887)
Figarismes de Caliban (Lemerre, 1888)
L'Amour en République, étude sociologique, 1870-1889 (1889)
Le Cruel Vaten-guerre, mémoires d'un grand homme, recueillis, orthographiés et mis en un beau désordre par Caliban. Çi est le premier livre, intitulé la Bataille du Gravase (1889)
Le Rire de Caliban (Charpentier, 1890)
La Chasse au mouflon, ou Petit Voyage philosophique en Corse (Delagrave, 1891)
L'Espagnole (Conquet, 1891)
Les Chroniques de l'homme masqué (1892)
Les Soirées de Calibangrève (1892)
Le Salon de 1892 : Champs-Élysées (1892)
Le Faublas malgré lui (1893)
Les Drames de l'honneur. Le Chèque, novel (1893)
Les Drames de l'honneur. La Vierge, novel (1894)
Faublas malgré lui (1903)
Contes de Caliban (1909)
Ballades et sonnets (1910)
Les Amours de Violette, roman (1910)
Les Contes facitieux (1910)
Souvenirs d'un enfant de Paris (4 volumes, 1911–1913)
Glanes et javelles, rimes nouvelles, 1910-1914 (1914)
Trente-six contes de toutes les couleurs (1919)

Plays
Une Amie, 1-act verse comedy, Paris, Théâtre-Français, 9 September 1865
Père et mari, 3-act prose drama, Paris, théâtre de Cluny, 21 June 1870
Séparés de corps, 1-act prose comedy, Paris, théâtre du Vaudeville, 11 March 1874
La Nuit bergamasque, 3-act tragi-comedy, Paris, théâtre-Libre, 30 May 1887
Le Premier Baiser, 1-act play, Paris, Comédie-Française, 20 May 1889
Le Capitaine Fracasse, heroic comedy in 5 acts and 7 tableaux, d'après le roman de Théophile Gautier, Paris, théâtre de l'Odéon, 10 October 1896
La Burgonde, opera in 4 acts and 5 tableaux, with Camille de Sainte-Croix, music by Paul Vidal, Paris, Théâtre de l'Opéra, 23 December 1898; publié chez Choudens, 1898
Plus que Reine, 5-act drama, with prologue and 7 tableaux, Paris, théâtre de la Porte-Saint-Martin, 28 March 1899
Théâtre (6 volumes, 1899)
La Pompadour, dramatic comedy in 7 tableaux, 1 prologue, 5 acts and 1 epilogue, Paris, théâtre de la Porte-Saint-Martin, 6 November 1901
Le Capitaine Blomet, 3-act comedy, Paris, théâtre Antoine, 3 December 1901
Petite mère, 4-act comedy, Paris, théâtre du Vaudeville, 29 April 1903
La Fontaine de Jouvence, 2-act verse mythological comedy, Paris, Comédie-Française, 4 July 1906
Vidocq, empereur des policiers, comedy in 5 acts and 7 tableaux, Paris, théâtre Sarah Bernhardt, 15 May 1910
L'Héritage d'Œdipe, verse comedy in 2 acts and 1 prologue, presented to and refused by the Comédie-Française, 5 May 1911
La Nuit florentine, 4-act verse comedy, whose prologue is a free adaptation of La Mandragore by Machiavelli, Paris, théâtre de l'Odéon, 20 February 1913

References

External links 
 
 
 Novels on the Bibliothèque électronique de Lisieux.
 Works by Émile Bergerat at the French Wikisource

1845 births
1923 deaths
19th-century French dramatists and playwrights
20th-century French dramatists and playwrights
19th-century French poets
20th-century French poets